Aloke Sharad Pandey (born 13 November 1966), better known as Chikki Pandey, is an Indian businessperson based in Mumbai. He, along with Ranjeet Deshmukh, co-founded the 'Akshara Foundation of Arts & Learning' which works towards providing education to under privileged children.

Personal life

Chikki Panday is the brother of actor Chunky Pandey and is married to Deanne Pandey and has two children daughter Alanna Panday (b.16 August 1995) and son Ahaan Panday (b. 23 December 1997).

Government appointments
Member of the Steel Consumers Council Govt of India
Member Telephone Advisory Committees of the Ministry of Communications and Information Technology (India)

References

External links
 AFAL India
MTNL Website list of TAC members
Department of Telecommunications Website
Ahaan Pandey Short Biography

Businesspeople from Mumbai
Living people
1966 births
Communications in Maharashtra